= Qafqazinfo =

Azerbaijani online newspaper

Qafqazinfo.az
- Website type: online newspaper
- Available in: Azerbaijani, Russian
- Founded: August 16, 2010
- Headquarters: Baku, {{{location_country}}}
- Founder: Elbrus Arud

Qafqazinfo.az is an online newspaper funded and controlled by Azerbaijani government operating in Azerbaijan. According to various digital media analytics, the portal is one of the most widely read websites in Azerbaijan.

== About ==
The "Qafqazinfo" portal began its operations on August 16, 2010. Along with news covering Azerbaijan's public, political, social, and cultural life, the website also delivers news from other Caucasus countries as well as from around the world. In addition, the site publishes interviews, analytical articles, reports, and opinion pieces on various topics. The founder of the website is Elbrus Arud, and the editor-in-chief is Gunel Abilova.

According to daily, weekly, and monthly statistics published by Azerbaijan's national digital media analytics platform "Metrix.az", "Qafqazinfo" ranks among the top three.

In 2021–2022, "Qafqazinfo.az" ranked among the top ten most searched websites in Azerbaijan on Google.
